Wałdowo  is a village in Gmina Miastko, Bytów County, Pomeranian Voivodeship, in northern Poland. Wałdowo lies in a forested area. The nearest city is Miastko, 13 km to the west.

From 1975 to 1998 the village was in Słupsk Voivodeship.

It has a population of 249.

References

Map of the Gmina Miastko

Villages in Bytów County